Tezpur railway station was a railway station located in Sonitpur district of Assam. Its code is TZTB. It serves Tezpur town. The station consists of one platform. The platform is not well sheltered. It lacks many facilities including water and sanitation.

References

External links
 

Railway stations in Sonitpur district
Rangiya railway division
Transport in Tezpur